Franklin Brooke Nihart (March 16, 1919 – August 30, 2006) was a highly decorated United States Marine Corps colonel. He was awarded the Navy Cross during the Korean War, and he later wrote the Code of Conduct and oversaw the development of several Marine Corps museums. A two-war veteran, Colonel Nihart was a noted military historian, weapons expert, and military museum director.

Early life and World War II 
F. Brooke Nihart was born on March 16, 1919, in Los Angeles, California. While he was still in high school, he joined the California National Guard. After graduating from Occidental College with a degree in political science and economics in 1940, he entered the Marine Corps' Platoon Leaders Class. Immediately assigned active duty, he graduated from The Basic School that same year, then located in Philadelphia.

Short assignments in infantry units followed before the outbreak of World War II. Lieutenant Nihart then served as a gunnery officer on board the aircraft carrier USS Saratoga (CV-3), when it unsuccessfully tried to assist Wake Island immediately after Pearl Harbor in December 1941. That was followed by other shipboard and infantry-amphibious training assignments and schooling. He taught both U.S. Marine and Army units amphibious landing tactics. From April to June 1945, Major Nihart served as the executive officer of 1st Battalion, 1st Marines during the battle of Okinawa. Following that, he was assigned to the forces in North China.

Korean War 
By August 1951, Lieutenant Colonel Nihart was given command of 2nd Battalion, 1st Marines, 1st Marine Division weeks prior to fighting in the last division offensive of the Korean War. By September 12, Nihart would be leading his battalion in a four day fight for Hill 749 at the Battle of the Punchbowl. Initially reported to be seized by an adjacent battalion due to a map reading error, Hill 749 was in fact not seized and proved to be the main line of resistance for an entire North Korean regiment, which had been improving its positions for months. The Marines of 2/1, thinking a passage of lines with friendly forces on 749 was imminent, instead encountered a storm of defensive fire from well entrenched, mutually supporting positions armed with artillery, mortars, and enfilading machine gun fire from the enemy's east and west flanks on ridges. The Marines would eventually clear and hold 749, but at significant expense.

Throughout the night of September 15 and into the next morning, Nihart led his battalion in repulsing numerous enemy attacks and was able to maintain a defensive perimeter despite heavy casualties among his Marines. The battle was so fierce that a Marine from Nihart's battalion, Corporal Joseph Vittori, single-handedly killed 200 of the enemy with a machine gun before he was killed. Vittori was later awarded the Medal of Honor. Nihart himself was awarded the Navy Cross for his actions during the battle.

In 1953, Nihart served on the Department of Defense's Advisory Committee on Prisoners of War. The committee discovered an alarming trend where prisoners of war revealed military secrets to their captors after undergoing brainwashing. Nihart was tasked with writing a code of conduct to prevent future American prisoners from revealing secrets. He ultimately wrote six articles, which President Dwight D. Eisenhower signed into law with an executive order on August 17, 1955.

Later career and life 
In 1959, Nihart served as a military attaché to the U.S. embassy in Rangoon, Burma. From October 1961 to July 1963, he was the commanding officer of the 7th Marine Regiment at Camp Pendleton, California, where he established a regimental history program.  Nihart also frequently wrote articles for the Marine Corps Gazette. Colonel Nihart retired from the Marines in 1966 and moved to McLean, Virginia.

Nihart served on the Commandant's Advisory Committee on Marine Corps History from 1968 to 1971. After serving as the managing editor for Armed Forces Journal, he was briefly recalled to active duty in 1973 to serve as the Deputy Director for Marine Corps Museums. Despite leaving the service again, he continued to fill the position as Deputy Director as a civilian, establishing the Marine Corps Museum at Washington Navy Yard in 1977. The following year he opened the Marine Corps Air-Ground Museum at Marine Corps Base Quantico, Virginia. Nihart retired as Deputy Director in 1992 and was awarded the Distinguished Service Award by the Marine Corps Historical Foundation.

Nihart was instrumental in preparing the opening of the National Museum of the Marine Corps in Triangle, Virginia, acquiring many of the vehicles and aircraft which were to be featured. He died of heart and kidney trouble on August 30, 2006, at Inova Fairfax Hospital in Falls Church Virginia. The National Museum of the Marine Corps opened just a few months later on November 10, 2006. Nihart was buried in Arlington National Cemetery.

See also 
 List of Navy Cross recipients for the Korean War

References 

1919 births
2006 deaths
United States Marine Corps personnel of World War II
United States Marine Corps personnel of the Korean War
American military historians
Burials at Arlington National Cemetery
California National Guard personnel
Military personnel from California
Occidental College alumni
People from Los Angeles
Recipients of the Navy Cross (United States)
Recipients of the Air Medal
United States Marine Corps colonels
United States naval attachés
Historians from California